Udey is both a given name and surname. Notable people with the name include:

Udey Chand (born 1935), Indian wrestler and wrestling coach
Udey Chand Dubey (1909–2009), Indian Army general and centenarian
Mark C. Udey, American biologist